{{Infobox writer
| name         = Kelly Cherry
| image        = KellyPhoto1.jpg
| imagesize    = 180px
| birth_name    = Kelly Cherry
| birth_date    = 
| birth_place   = Baton Rouge, Louisiana, US
|death_date   = 
|death_place  = Halifax, Virginia, United States
| occupation   = 
| nationality  = American
| alma_mater   = University of Mary WashingtonUniversity of VirginiaUniversity of North Carolina at Greensboro
| spouse       = Burke Davis III
| subject      =
| period       =
| genre        =
| movement     =
| notableworks = Quartet for J. Robert Oppenheimer (poems) Twelve Women in a Country Called America: StoriesA Kind of DreamGirl in a Library: On Women Writers & the Writing LifeHazard and Prospect: New and Selected PoemsThe Retreats of Thought| influences   =
| influenced   =
| awards       = 
| signature    =
}}
Kelly Cherry (December 21, 1940 – March 18, 2022) was a novelist, poet, essayist, professor, and literary critic and a former Poet Laureate of Virginia (2010–2012). She was the author of more than 30 books, including the poetry collections Songs for a Soviet Composer, Death and Transfiguration, Rising Venus and The Retreats of Thought. Her short fiction was reprinted in The Best American Short Stories, Prize Stories: The O. Henry Awards, The Pushcart Prize, and New Stories from the South, and won a number of awards.

Life
Cherry was born in Baton Rouge, Louisiana, to J. Milton, a violinist and music professor, and Mary Spooner, a violinist and writer. She moved to Ithaca, New York, at age 5, and Chesterfield County, Virginia, at age 9.

She received her bachelor's degree from Mary Washington College in 1961 and an MFA in 1967 from the University of North Carolina at Greensboro. She married Jonathan Silver in 1966 and divorced him in 1969. She later married Walter Burke Davis III, a writer, journalist and bookseller.

Cherry died on March 18, 2022, at the age of 81. She was survived by her dog, Booker, and preceded in death by her husband Burke Davis III. The editors of storySouth dedicated the magazine's spring 2022 issue to her for her support of "all the little magazines."

Career

Early career

Cherry graduated from the University of Mary Washington in 1961, did graduate work at the University of Virginia in philosophy as a Du Pont Fellow, and received a Master of Fine Arts from the University of North Carolina at Greensboro. After working in publishing for some years, she accepted a position at Southwest Minnesota State College. She began teaching at the University of Wisconsin–Madison in 1977. Cherry later became the Eudora Welty Professor Emerita of English and Evjue-Bascom Professor Emerita in the Humanities at the University of Wisconsin–Madison.

Later career
Cherry retired in 1999 and in retirement held chairs and distinguished writer positions at a number of universities, including the University of Alabama in Huntsville (Eminent Scholar), Colgate University, Mercer University, Atlantic Center for the Arts, and Hollins University.

A resident of Halifax, Virginia, she was named the state's Poet Laureate by Governor Bob McDonnell in July 2010. She succeeded Claudia Emerson in this post (Poet Laureate of Virginia, 2008–2010).

 Literary themes and styles 
Cherry's poetry frequently focused on issues related to philosophy and language, and has been described as trying to "discover within the art of poetry methods and procedures identical to, or closely analogous with, those of a science or a rigorous formal philosophy." Or as Cherry described it, "the becoming-aware of abstraction in real life--since, in order to abstract, you must have something to abstract from."

Within her novels, the abstract notions of morality become her focus: "My novels deal with moral dilemmas and the shapes they create as they reveal themselves in time. My poems seek out the most suitable temporal or kinetic structure for a given emotion." As described in Contemporary Authors, Cherry "manages to capture, in very readable stories, the indecisiveness and mute desperation of life in the twentieth century."

From the beginning of her career, Cherry wrote both formal verse and free verse. According to the citation preceding her receipt of the James G. Hanes Poetry Prize by the Fellowship of Southern Writers in 1989, "Her poetry is marked by a firm intellectual passion, a reverent desire to possess the genuine thought of our century, historical, philosophical, and scientific, and a species of powerful ironic wit which is allied to rare good humor." Reviewing Relativity, Patricia Goedicke noted in Three Rivers Poetry Journal that "her familiarity with the demands and pressures of traditional patterns has resulted...in an expansion and deepening of her poetic resources, a carefully textured over- and underlay of image, meaning and diction." Mark Harris felt that Cherry's "ability to sustain a narrative by clustering and repeating images [lends] itself to longer forms, and 'A Bird's Eye View of Einstein,' the longest poem in [Relativity], is an example of Cherry at her poetic best." Reviewing Cherry's collection, Death and Transfiguration, Patricia Gabilondo wrote in The Anglican Theological Review that "the abstract prose poem 'Requiem' that closes this book...translates personal loss into the historical and universal, providing an occasion for philosophical meditation on the mystery of suffering and the need for transcendence in a post-Holocaust world that seems to offer none. Moving through the terrors of nihilism and doubt, Cherry, in a poem that deftly alternates between the philosophically abstract and the image's graphic force, gives us an intellectually honest and deeply moving vision of our relation to each other's suffering and of God's relation to humanity's 'memory of pain'."

Teaching positions in retirement
Rivers-Coffey Distinguished Chair, Appalachian State University
Louis D. Rubin, Jr., Writer-in-Residence, Hollins University
Master Artist, Atlantic Center for the Arts
Ferrol A. Sams, Jr., Distinguished Chair in English, Mercer University
NEH Visiting Professor in the Humanities, Colgate University
Eminent Scholar, University of Alabama in Huntsville, 1999-2004

While at the University of Wisconsin
Wyndham Robertson Writer-in-Residence, Hollins University
Distinguished Professor, Rhodes College
Full Professor and Distinguished Writer-in-Residence, Western Washington University

Other positions and posts include
Member, Electorate, Cathedral of St. John the Divine, NYC (five-year term beginning 2009; extended to 2016; now Electorate Emeritus)
Associated Writing Programs Board of Directors (1990–93)
Discipline Advisory Committee for Fulbright Awards (1991–94)
Advisory Editor, Shenandoah (1988–92)
Contributing Editor, The Hollins Critic (1996–present)
Contributing Editor, The Smart Set (2015–present)

Bibliography

Novels
 
 Reprinted: Ballantine (1975); Boson Books (1995)Augusta Played, Houghton Mifflin, (1979), ; Louisiana State University Press, (1984). A novel.
: A novel. LSU Press, 2004. The Lost Traveller's Dream, Harcourt Brace Jovanovich, (1984) . A novel.
 My Life and Dr. Joyce Brothers. A novel in stories. Algonquin Books of Chapel Hill, (1990); reprinted by University of Alabama Press, (2002).We Can Still Be Friends, Soho Press, (2003) hardback; (2004) trade paper, . A novel.

Short fictionConversion, Treacle Press, (1979) . A story.The Society of Friends: Stories, University of Missouri Press, (1999) 
 The Woman Who. Boson Books (2010), Bitingduck Press. Short stories.
 A Kind of Dream. Interlinked short stories, U. of Wisconsin Press, spring 2014. 
 Twelve Women in a Country Called America: Stories. Press 53, May 2015. 
 Temporium: Before the Beginning To After the End: Fictions. Press 53. October, 2017.

NonfictionThe Globe and the Brain: On Place in Fiction, Talking River Publications, Lewis-Clark State College, (2006) History, Passion, Freedom, Death, and Hope: Prose about Poetry, University of Tampa Press, (2005) The Poem: An Essay, Sandhills Press, 1999Girl in a Library: On Women Writers and the Writing Life, BkMk Press/University of Missouri-Kansas City, 2009, 

 Poetry 
Collections
 Beholder's Eye, poems. Groundhog Poetry Press, 2017.
 Weather, poems. A chapbook. N.Y.: Rain Mountain Press, 2017.Quartet for J. Robert Oppenheimer: A Poem. (In shorter poems.) LSU Press, February 2017.Physics for Poets: Poems. Unicorn Press, spring 2015The Life and Death of Poetry: Poems, LSU Press, March 2013Vectors: J. Robert Oppenheimer: The Years before the Bomb, Parallel Press, 2012Benjamin John, March Street Press, 1993, Natural Theology, Louisiana State University Press, 1988, Lovers and Agnostics, Carnegie Mellon University Press, 1995, An Other Woman, Somers Rocks Press, 2000Songs for a Soviet Composer, Singing Wind Press, 1980, Time Out of Mind, March Street Press, 1994, Relativity: A Point of View, Louisiana State University Press, 1977, Welsh Table Talk, The Book Arts Conservatory, 2004

List of poems

OtherA Kelly Cherry Reader. TX: Stephen F. Austin State University Press, 2015. Intro by Fred Chappell.  Stories, novel excerpts, essays (familiar, instructive), eight poems.

Translations
Antigone (trans.), in Sophocles, 2, ed. by Slavitt and Bovie
Octavia (trans.), in Seneca: The Tragedies, Vol. 2, ed. Slavitt and Bovie

Publications in Prize Anthologies
Best American Short Stories (1972)
Prize Stories: The O. Henry Award (1994)
The Pushcart Prize (1977)
New Stories from the South (1989, 2009)

Honors, awards and fellowships

Honors
2010–12    Poet Laureate of Virginia

Awards
2017 The William "Singing Billy" Walker Award for  Lifetime Achievement in Southern Letters
2016 Lifetime Achievement Award from the University of North Carolina at Greensboro
2015   Finalist, Library of Virginia Fiction Award for A Kind of Dream: Stories.
2015   Selected by LJ among 30 Top Indie Fiction titles.
2013   L. E. Phillabaum Poetry Award
2012   Carole Weinstein Poetry Prize
2012   Rebecca Mitchell Taramuto Short Fiction Prize for "On Familiar Terms," Blackbird at www.blackbird.vcu.edu
2011   The Bravo!Award by the Chesterfield Public Education Foundation, Chesterfield County Public Schools in Virginia, USA
2010   Finalist, People's Choice Awards, Library of Virginia, for Girl in a Library: On Women Writers & the Writing Life2010   Director’s Visitor, Institute for Advanced Study, Princeton, New Jersey
2010   The Ellen Anderson Award (first recipient) from the Poetry Society of Virginia
2009   Finalist (with Marvin Bell and Mark Jarman) for The Poets' Prize
2009   Finalist, Book of the Year Award, ForeWord Magazine, nonfiction, for Girl in a Library: On Women Writers and the Writing Life2002   Book of the Year Award by ForeWord Magazine, Silver Prize for Poetry, for Rising Venus.
2000   Bradley Major Achievement Award (Lifetime), Council for Wisconsin Writers
2000   Distinguished Alumnus Award, University of Mary Washington
2000   Dictionary of Literary Biography Award for the best volume of short stories (The Society of Friends: Stories) published in 1999
 1999  Leidig Lectureship in Poetry, Emory & Henry College 
1992   USIS Arts America Speaker Award (The Philippines). USIS is now called the USIA
1992, 1991    Wisconsin Arts Board New Work Awards
 1991  VCCA Writers Exchange Fellow (with Edwin Honig et al.) to Russia (Leningrad, Peredelkino, Yalta)
1991   First Prize for Book-length Fiction, Council for Wisconsin Writers (for My Life and Dr. Joyce Brothers)
1991   Wisconsin Notable Author, Literary Committee of the Wisconsin Library Association
1990, 1987, 1983    PEN Syndicated Fiction Awards
1989  Hanes Poetry Prize given by the Fellowship of Southern Writers for a body of work, first recipient.
1980  First Prize for Book-length Fiction, Council for Wisconsin Writers (for Augusta Played)
1974  Canaras Award for first novel, Sick and Full of BurningFellowships
2009    Rockefeller Foundation Fellowship, USA
2005    Fellow, Le Moulin à Nef, Auvillar, France
1997    WARF Award (Eudora Welty Chair)
1993    Bascom Award (Evjue-Bascom Chair)
1994    Hawthornden Residency Fellowship, Scotland
1991, 1988, 1984    Wisconsin Arts Board Fellowships, USA
1989, 1979    Fellow, Yaddo
1986    Fellow, The Ragdale Foundation, USA
1984    UW Chancellor's Award
1983    UW Romnes Fellowship
1979    National Endowment for the Arts Fellowship, USA
1978    Fellow, Virginia Center for the Creative Arts, USA. Also, 1985; 1986; December–January 1987/1988; 1989; December–February 1990/1991; 2003; 2004; 2007; 2011 (Weinstein Fellow); June 13-July 14, 2013
1975     Allan Collins Fellowship, Bread Loaf, USA

References

Further reading

 Elliot, Okla.  What Kelly Cherry Knows''. "An Embarrassment of Riches". Inside Higher Ed BlogU. Inside the Education of Ornate Churm. August 4, 2011."An Embarrassment of Riches" by Okla Elliot. What Kelly Cherry Knows. Inside Higher Ed BlogU. Inside the Education of Ornate Churm. August 4, 2011. interview by Okla Elliot
 Alger, Derek. "From the Editor: Interview with Kelly Cherry". PIF Magazine. October 1, 2010. "From the Editor: Interview with Kelly Cherry" by Derek Alger. PIF Magazine. October 1, 2010. interview by Derek Alger

External links
Kelly Cherry's former website
Poets Laureate of Virginia from the Library of Congress

1940 births
2022 deaths
20th-century American essayists
20th-century American novelists
20th-century American poets
20th-century American women writers
20th-century American short story writers
21st-century American essayists
21st-century American novelists
21st-century American poets
21st-century American women writers
21st-century American short story writers
American women academics
American women essayists
American women novelists
American women poets
American women short story writers
The Atlantic (magazine) people
Chapbook writers
Novelists from Louisiana
Novelists from Virginia
Novelists from Wisconsin
People from Chesterfield County, Virginia
People from Halifax, Virginia
Poets from Louisiana
Poets from North Carolina
Poets from Virginia
Poets from Wisconsin
Poets Laureate of Virginia
University of Mary Washington alumni
University of North Carolina at Greensboro alumni
University of Virginia alumni
University of Wisconsin–Madison faculty